The 2014–15 Toto Cup Al was the 30th season of the third-important football tournament in Israel since its introduction and the 10th tournament involving Israeli Premier League clubs only. The tournament resumed after the planned competition for the previous season was cancelled.

The competition was held in two stages. First, fourteen Premier League teams were divided into three groups, five teams in groups A and C and four teams in group B, the teams playing against each other once. The best 3 teams from groups A and C and the best 2 teams from group B advanced to the quarter finals, which was played over two legged ties. The semi-finals and the final were played as one-legged matches in a neutral venue.

The tournament was due to start on 2 August 2014, however the opening date was postponed because of the 2014 Israel–Gaza conflict. The tournament eventually started on 12 August 2014.

Hapoel Haifa were the defending champions, after winning the previous competition. who made it their second Toto Cup Al title overall. In the final, played on 31 December 2014, Maccabi Tel Aviv had beaten Maccabi Haifa 2–1. This cup was the first title gained by Maccabi Tel Aviv this season, and was followed by the State Cup and the league title, to complete its domestic treble.

Group stage
The draw took place on 26 June 2014.

The matches were due to start on 26 July 2014, however delays occurred by the 2014 Israel-Gaza conflict caused the matches to start on 12 August 2014.

Group A

Group B

Group C

Knockout rounds
The quarter finals draw was held on 3 September, although the third qualifying club from Group C was still undetermined.

Quarterfinals

First leg

Second leg

Maccabi Haifa won 6–4 on aggregate.

Hapoel Haifa won 4–2 on aggregate.

Maccabi Tel Aviv won 8–0 on aggregate.

F.C. Ashdod won 4–1 on aggregate.

Semifinals

Final

See also
 2014–15 Toto Cup Leumit
 2014–15 Israeli Premier League
 2014–15 Israel State Cup

References

External links
 Official website  

Al
Toto Cup Al
Toto Cup Al